The women's solo was one of two events in the synchronized swimming program at the 1992 Summer Olympics. The finals was held on 6 August 1992.
 
Two gold medals were awarded in solo synchronized swimming after a judge inadvertently entered the score of "8.7" instead of the intended "9.7" in the computerized scoring system for one of Sylvie Fréchette's figures. This error ultimately placed Fréchette second, leaving Kristen Babb-Sprague for the gold medal. Following an appeal FINA awarded Fréchette a gold medal, replacing her silver medal and leaving the two swimmers both with gold.

This event was discontinued after these Olympics in favor of a team event.

Results

Qualification

Final

References

Synchronized swimming at the 1992 Summer Olympics
1992 in women's sport
Women's events at the 1992 Summer Olympics